Samuel Carson may refer to:

Samuel Allen Carson, former Alberta politician
Samuel Price Carson (1798–1838), former United States politician